McCall-Donnelly Joint School District  is a school district headquartered in McCall, Idaho.  its enrollment count is about 1,300. Its territory includes sections of Valley and Adams counties, with 98% of its territory in the former and the remainder in the latter.

History
It was established in 1950.

Glen Szymoniak served as superintendent until his December 19, 2014 resignation. Jim Foudy, previously principal of Barbara R. Morgan Elementary School, became interim superintendent immediately and was formally named superintendent in April 2015.

Schools
 Secondary
 McCall-Donnelly High School (McCall) - grades 9-12
 Payette Lakes Middle School (McCall) - grades 6-8

 Elementary (Preschool-Grade 50
 Barbara R. Morgan Elementary School (McCall)
 Donnelly Elementary School (Donnelly)

 Alternative
 Heartland High School (for secondary grades)

References

External links
 McCall-Donnelly School District
School districts in Idaho
Education in Adams County, Idaho
Education in Valley County, Idaho
School districts established in 1950
1950 establishments in Idaho